John Michael Pyle (born November 23, 1956) is an American fugitive from justice for possession of child pornography, former businessman, and noted ultramarathoner.

Personal life
Born on November 23, 1956, John Michael Pyle dropped out of Manatee High School to pursue a career in carpentry.  By his 20s, Pyle was an alcoholic; in 1980 or 1981, he married a woman named Toni, and he entered alcohol rehabilitation on February 28, 1987.  The Pyles opened businesses in the construction and clothing industries, but became bankrupt in the business cycle of the 2000s.

Running
Under the tutelage of Ray Zahab, in 2012 Pyle spent 80 straight days running  from San Francisco to Key West.  He was raising funds and awareness for the Wounded Warrior Project, carrying a  flag of the United States the whole way.  Pyle was interviewed by local news outlets along his run, and was recognized at a Houston Astros game when he ran through that Texas city.

Criminal activity
In the late 20th century, Pyle was arrested for driving under the influence, possession of marijuana, and check kiting.

Child pornography
At approximately 6:45a.m. on June 24, 2016, the Sarasota Police Department searched Pyle's Sarasota, Florida condominium based on three tips received from the National Center for Missing & Exploited Children.  They found 48 images of child pornography, including 15 depicting child sexual abuse and two with bondage; girls as young as seven and one year old were pictured.  Due to the quantity of images, ages of the victims, and severity of the acts, Pyle was charged with 30 second-degree felonies for possessing child pornography (as opposed to third-degree charges), which could bring a sentence of 450 years imprisonment.

When he failed to attend a hearing 16 months later on October 23, 2017, he became a fugitive. Despite lacking his passport, Pyle boarded a Carnival cruise ship bound for Cozumel, Mexico. When Carnival called Pyle's brother to tell him that Pyle had failed to reboard in Cozumel, bounty hunters went to search for him. Pyle was last seen in the Mexican state of Nuevo León on February 16, 2018, and by June it was believed he was no longer in that nation.

In June 2022, Pyle was arrested by the United States Marshals Service and Instituto Nacional de Migración in Mérida, Yucatán, and then transferred to Marshals' custody in Miami.

See also
 List of fugitives from justice who disappeared

References

1956 births
American male ultramarathon runners
fugitives wanted by the United States
living people
sportspeople from Sarasota, Florida